Den Osse is a hamlet in the municipality of Schouwen-Duiveland, in Zeeland, Netherlands.

Den Osse is not a statistical entity, and the postal authorities have placed it under Brouwershaven. Den Osse has mainly become a holiday resort and marina. It has its own place name signs. There are only about 15 houses for permanent residence.

References 

Schouwen-Duiveland
Populated places in Zeeland